Kimanga is a Tanzanian administrative ward located in Ilala District, Dar es Salaam Region of Tanzania. According to the 2012 census, the ward has a total population of 78,557.

References 

Ilala District